2016 Alamo Bowl may refer to:

2016 Alamo Bowl (January)
2016 Alamo Bowl (December)